American Women's Voluntary Services (AWVS) was the largest American women's service organization in the United States during World War II. AWVS provided women volunteers who provided support services to help the nation during the war such as message delivery, ambulance driving, selling war bonds, emergency kitchens, cycle corps drivers, dog-sled teamsters, aircraft spotters, navigation, aerial photography, fighting fires, truck driving,  and canteen workers. Some of its work overlapped with the Office of Civilian Defense and the American Red Cross.

Foundation

Alice Throckmorton McLean founded AWVS in January 1940, 23 months before the United States entered the war, basing it upon the British Women's Voluntary Services, in order to help prepare the nation for the war. Most of the founders were wealthy internationalist women, and its headquarters was in New York City, making America's isolationists suspicious of AWVS. Others saw the organization as being alarmist. AWVS also encountered resistance because some men did not want women working. Despite these concerns, AWVS had about 18,000 members by the time of the attack on Pearl Harbor on December 7, 1941. Eventually over 325,000 women were trained by AWVS. Doris Ryer Nixon founded the California chapter in August 1941 and became AWVS's national vice president.

The group sponsored units in African, Chinese, and Hispanic American parts of the United States, which led to lampooning by the news media. By 1944, despite hundreds of thousands of volunteers and large efforts to help win the war, AWVS was accused of being lazy; its leaders decided to disband the organization at the end of the war—their specific purpose was to support the war effort.

Actresses who were AWVS members included Joan Crawford, Hattie McDaniel, Betty White and Lillian Randolph.  AWVS inspired other volunteer service groups, such as "Laguna Cottages for Seniors".

See also
United States home front during World War II#Volunteer activities
United Service Organizations

Notes

External links

Bill Guarnere site, who served with Lewis Nixon, discussion about AWVS
History of British Women's Voluntary Service
Smithsonian National Air and Space Museum, American Women's Voluntary Services badge
University of North Carolina at Greensboro, American Women's Voluntary Services garrison cap, c. 1942
University of North Carolina at Greensboro, American Women's Voluntary Services legionnaire kepi, c. 1942

Organizations established in 1940
Clubs and societies in the United States
United States home front during World War II
World War II non-governmental organizations
1940 establishments in the United States